, was an Okinawan martial arts master who helped to continue the Matsumura family style of Shōrin-ryū karate-do.

History
Nabe Mastsumura, born 1860, was the grandson of Matsumura Sōkon, who founded the Shōrin-ryū style of karate. Being related to Sōkon meant that Nabe was privileged to extremely thorough training from his grandfather in the family's style, as well as the secret White Crane system that was only taught to immediate family members.

In his martial arts career as a sensei, Nabe had only one student: his nephew, Hohan Sōken. Upon his death in 1930, he passed his Menkyo Kaiden to Hohan Sōken, who continued the Matsumura family tradition by solidifying the Shōrin-ryū style of Matsumura Seito karate-do.

References

1860 births
1930 deaths
Okinawan male karateka
Shōrin-ryū practitioners